The 11th Luftwaffe Field Division was an infantry division of the Luftwaffe branch of the Wehrmacht that fought in World War II.

History 
The division was formed into the army on 1 November 1943, near Novgorod in Northern Russia.  From 1 January 1943 till August 1944 it was stationed in the occupied Greece, and was moved to occupied Greek Macedonia on September of that year.
 
On 9 August 1944 this division was implicated in the largest roundup in Athens, «Raid of Kokkinia», with hundreds of civilians participating in the resistance executed, thousands of hostages sent to concentration camps, burning down of entire house blocks, and significant atrocities.

Commanders
 Colonel Alexander Bourquin, (14 November 1943 - 30 November 1943)
 Generalleutnant Wilhelm Köhler, (1 December 1943 - 25 November 1944)
 Generalmajor Gerhard Henke, (1 November 1944 - Capitulation)

References

Sources 
Lexikon der Wehrmacht Luftwaffen-Felddivision 11

0*011
Military units and formations established in 1943
Military units and formations disestablished in 1944